Tea for Three is a lost 1927 American comedy silent film directed by Robert Z. Leonard and written by Garrett Graham, F. Hugh Herbert, Roi Cooper Megrue and Lucille Newmark. The film stars Lew Cody, Aileen Pringle, and Owen Moore. Supporting players were Phillips Smalley, Dorothy Sebastian and Edward Thomas. The film was released on October 29, 1927, by Metro-Goldwyn-Mayer.

Cast 
Lew Cody as Carter Langford
Aileen Pringle as Doris Langford
Owen Moore as Philip Collamore
Phillips Smalley as Harrington
Dorothy Sebastian as Annette
Edward Thomas as Austin, the butler

References

External links 
 

1927 films
1920s English-language films
Silent American comedy films
1927 comedy films
Metro-Goldwyn-Mayer films
Films directed by Robert Z. Leonard
American black-and-white films
American silent feature films
American films based on plays
Lost American films
1927 lost films
Lost comedy films
Films with screenplays by F. Hugh Herbert
1920s American films